Gettin' Around is an album by American jazz saxophonist Dexter Gordon recorded in 1965 and released by Blue Note. The CD reissue added two bonus tracks.

Reception
The review in Billboard magazine in 1966 called Gordon's playing "cool and hot", especially praising his improvisations  on "Heartaches". The support of the rhythm section was said to be "A-1 all the way".

The AllMusic review by Michael G. Nastos was less enthusiastic stated: "While this is not Gordon's ultimate hard bop date, it is reflective of his cooling out in Europe, adopting a tonal emphasis more under the surface than in your face. It's not essential, but quite enjoyable, and does mark a turning point in his illustrious career."

Track listing
 "Manhã de Carnaval" (Luiz Bonfá, Antonio Maria)8:26
 "Who Can I Turn To (When Nobody Needs Me)" (Leslie Bricusse, Anthony Newley)5:15
 "Heartaches" (Al Hoffman, John Klenner)7:46
 "Shiny Stockings" (Frank Foster)6:18
 "Everybody's Somebody's Fool" (Howard Greenfield, Jack Keller)6:45
 "Le Coiffeur" (Dexter Gordon)7:01
 "Very Saxily Yours"6:54 (Onzy Matthews) Bonus track on CD reissue
 "Flick of a Trick"10:36 (Ben Tucker) Bonus track on CD reissue

Recorded on May 28 (1, 5–6, 8) and May 29 (2–4, 7), 1965.

Personnel
Dexter Gordontenor saxophone
Bobby Hutchersonvibes
Barry Harrispiano
Bob Cranshawbass
Billy Higginsdrums

References

Blue Note Records albums
Dexter Gordon albums
1966 albums
Albums recorded at Van Gelder Studio
Albums produced by Alfred Lion